Steichen is a crater on Mercury.  Its name was adopted by the International Astronomical Union (IAU) in 2010. The crater is named for American photographer and painter Edward Steichen.

Steichen is one of 110 peak ring basins on Mercury.  Some of the mountains of the peak ring appear to have hollows on them.

References

Impact craters on Mercury